Huma ( or) is a village located in the Gevgelija municipality of North Macedonia. It is only a few kilometres from the border with Greece.

Notable people
 Petar Atanasov (born 1939), Megleno-Romanian linguist

References

Villages in North Macedonia
Megleno-Romanian settlements